Saltsburg is a borough in Indiana County, Pennsylvania, United States. Its location is in western Pennsylvania, in the southwestern corner of Indiana County near its border with Westmoreland County. 

The town was based on the construction of salt wells and the canals and railroad tracks that passed through it. Its population was 780 at the 2020 census.

History

On June 20, 1769, William Gray conducted the first survey in the Saltsburg area. Early settlers of the wooded region were mainly Scots-Irish immigrants, migrating west between 1768 and 1795. The settlers did not colonize the area near the Kiskiminetas River until 1795 because of Native Americans defending their land.

The name 'Saltsburg' was adopted because of the salt grain that flourished in the area. Around the years 1795–1798, a Mrs. Deemer was the first settler to prove salt was present in the Conemaugh River, about one mile above Saltsburg's present site, in the town now known as Moween. Deemer produced a sample of salt by evaporating the water from the river.

In January 1817 the first sale of land was made to the Congregation of Saltsburg. In 1816-1817 Andrew Boggs purchased a large amount of land, which held the first town lots. The town was named with the common consent of the first settlers for the newly thriving salt industry. The town's religion was mainly Presbyterian, which was also the denomination of the first church built in Saltsburg. The first house was built in 1820 and now is occupied with the Presbyterian Church.

The town quickly filled with merchants in the late 1820s and became a prosperous place to reside. John Carson became the first tailor in 1827. Daniel Davis was the first blacksmith in 1828, and George Johnston was the first merchant in 1829. The population of the town continued to grow, and in 1838, the town was declared a borough. In 1840 the estimated population was 335.

The primary means of transportation in the area were on foot, carriage, train, or boat. The canal and railroad were major trade conduits for the town and the region. As the town grew it became a site for the passage of the mainline canal from Harrisburg to Pittsburgh. Coal and salt were transported along the canal and boat-building became one of the chief industries of the town. In 1835 and 1836, Robert Young, Butler Meyers, and Jacob Newhouse opened the first canal-boat construction business in the town. In 1855 the railroad bridge was built, with Major S.S. Jameson as the contractor and with the help of the principal mason John Marth. By 1864 the railroad brought an end to the canal era. The growth of the town was minimal until coalmines became prevalent in the 1870s.

Dr. John McFarland, a graduate of Jefferson Medical College, was the town's first physician; he came to Saltsburg in 1836. McFarland was also the director of the Indiana County Medical Society and an instructor at the Saltsburg Academy. He served in the state House of Representatives from 1845 to 1846 and became one of the first directors of the Northern Pennsylvania Railroad. The first school was a log house located closer to the trestlework or railroad bridge. John Whittlesey was the first teacher, and John Bucklin was the second. The Saltsburg Academy was established in 1852.

Saltsburg is located in the southwestern corner of Indiana County, Pennsylvania. It currently has an estimated population of 923. The borough maintains a police department with one police officer. Supplemental police protection is provided by the Pennsylvania State Police. Saltsburg also has a volunteer fire department (Station 131). There is an elementary school as well as a high school, located next to the Kiskiminetas River. The economy of Saltsburg is based on small restaurants, a few salons, a gas station, and a grocery store.  The Rebecca B. Hadden Stone House Museum is located at 105 Point Street and has been standing since the days of the canal. The Saltsburg Area Historical Society retains information from the past of the town and the people and their ancestors of the area.

The Saltsburg Historic District was listed on the National Register of Historic Places in 1992.

Geography
Saltsburg is located at the confluence of the Conemaugh River and Loyalhanna Creek, which form the Kiskiminetas River.

The total area is 16.67% water.

Demographics

As of the 2000 United States census, there were 955 people, 406 households, and 261 families residing in the borough. The population density was 4,628.9 people per square mile (1,755.8/km2). There were 445 housing units at an average density of 2,156.9 per square mile (818.2/km2). The racial makeup of the borough was 99.16% White, 0.21% African American, 0.10% Native American, 0.31% Asian, 0.21% from other races. Hispanic or Latino of any race were 1.36% of the population.

There were 406 households, out of which 30.0% had children under the age of 18 living with them, 48.8% were married couples living together, 11.6% had a female householder with no husband present, and 35.7% were non-families. 33.5% of all households were made up of individuals, and 19.7% had someone living alone who was 65 years of age or older. The average household size was 2.33 and the average family size was 2.97.

In the borough, the population was spread out, with 25.4% under the age of 18, 7.3% from 18 to 24, 25.5% from 25 to 44, 22.7% from 45 to 64, and 19.0% who were 65 years of age or older. The median age was 38 years. For every 100 females, there were 91.4 males. For every 100 females age 18 and over, there were 81.2 males.

The median income for a household in the borough was $27,448, and the median income for a family was $37,614. Males had a median income of $32,778 versus $24,688 for females. The per capita income for the borough was $14,580. About 11.4% of families and 12.7% of the population were below the poverty line, including 14.7% of those under age 18 and 11.9% of those age 65 or over.

Culture

Every year in early June, Saltsburg holds a community celebration in the Canal Park and on Point Street lasting three days, including live music, a fireworks display, and the annual duck race, in which plastic ducks are numbered and thrown into the river from the bridge.

Saltsburg also holds community days in early September called "Canal Days", including booths along the canal in the town containing crafts, food, and games, as well as live music, fireworks, and a poker run bicycle ride along the West Penn Trail. At the end of the ride, each person receives five cards to create a poker hand.

Education
 Saltsburg Elementary
 Saltsburg Junior/Senior High School
 The Kiski School

References

Bibliography 

 Anderson, Jenella M.  Indiana County Heritage in Early Historic Saltsburg, ed. Mary Carson, (Indiana, PA: 1970–1971).
 Johnson, George B. Saltsburg and The Pennsylvania Canal. (Saltsburg, PA: Historic Saltsburg Inc., 1984).
 Sechrist, Ruth.  "Rebecca B. Hadden Stone House Museum," in Historic Saltsburg Pennsylvania.
 Stephenson, Clarence D. The Early Salt Industry of the Conemaugh - Kiskiminetas Valley. 1 ed. Indiana County Heritage. 4, Marion Center, PA: Mahonin Mineograph and Pamphlet Service, 1968.
 Stephenson, Clarence D.  The Pennsylvania Canal Indiana and Westmoreland Counties. (Indiana, PA: The A.G. Halldin Publishing Company).
 Telander, Franklin. "Saltsburg: An Historic Pennsylvania Canal Town," in Westmoreland History, (Summer/Fall 2000): 24–31.

External links
 Saltsburg official website

Populated places established in 1817
Boroughs in Indiana County, Pennsylvania
1878 establishments in Pennsylvania